Adrian Gheorghe Șut (born 30 April 1999) is a Romanian professional footballer who plays as a midfielder for Liga I club FCSB.

Club career

Early career
Born in Cociuba Mare, Bihor County, Șut played youth football for local side Izvorul, Liberty Salonta and ASA Târgu Mureș. He registered his professional debut for the latter on 2 May 2016, aged 18, in a 1–6 Liga I away loss to Viitorul Constanța.

Șut went on to represent Unirea Jucu, Pandurii Târgu Jiu and Academica Clinceni in the lower leagues, before returning to the top flight by signing for FCSB in the summer of 2019. He was immediately loaned back to Clinceni for one season.

FCSB
Șut made his debut for FCSB on 24 September 2020, starting in a 0–2 loss to Slovan Liberec in the UEFA Europa League third qualifying round. He amassed 27 appearances during his first campaign in Bucharest, of which 24 in the national league.

His first goal for the Roș-albaștrii came on 28 November 2021, in a 3–2 away defeat of title contenders Universitatea Craiova. On 22 May 2022, Șut scored twice in a 3–1 win over CFR Cluj, which had mathematically clinched the Liga I trophy the previous fixture.

International career
Șut was called up for the Romania national under-21 team on 19 November 2019 for a game against Northern Ireland.

Career statistics

Club

Honours
FCSB
Supercupa României runner-up: 2020

References

External links

FCSB official profile 

1999 births
Living people
People from Bihor County
Romanian footballers
Association football midfielders
CF Liberty Oradea players
Liga I players
Liga II players
Liga III players
ASA 2013 Târgu Mureș players
CS Pandurii Târgu Jiu players
LPS HD Clinceni players
FC Steaua București players